Lazzarato is an Italian surname. Notable people with the surname include:

 David Lazzarato, Canadian businessman and board member of Flutter Entertainment
 Gigi Lazzarato (known as Gigi Goregous), Canadian internet personality and socialite
 Maurizio Lazzarato (born 1955), Italian sociologist and philosopher

See also
 Lazzarotto

Italian-language surnames